Châteauneuf-de-Randon is a village and commune in the Lozère department in southern France.

History
The battle of Châteauneuf-de-Randon was fought in 1380 between the English and the French. In 1380 the fortress of Châteauneuf-de-Randon was besieged by the French, under the command of Bertrand du Guesclin, and the fortress was defended by an English garrison under De Ros. The town surrendered on the 4th of July. The siege, however, was fatal to the French commander.

Geography
The Chapeauroux forms part of the commune's western border, flows eastward through the middle of the commune, then forms part of its eastern border.

See also
Communes of the Lozère department

References

External links
Chateauneuf de Randon

Chateauneufderandon
Gévaudan